Hi-Tension are a British band based in North West London, and are pioneers of Brit funk. with the original line-up being Paul Philips (guitarist), Jeff Guishard (percussionist & vocalist), David Joseph (keyboard player and lead vocals), Paul McLean (lead guitar and vocals) Ken Joseph (bass player) Patrick McLean (Saxophonist & vocalist), David Reid and Paapa Mensah (both drummers) and Leroy Williams. Hi-Tension originally performed as 'Hot Wax' & due to legal technicality, changed the band name to Hi-Tension in 1977. They had hits with the songs "Hi Tension" and "British Hustle" top 10 & 20 UK national pop chart.

Biography
In 1971, the group started as Hott Wax with original members being Paul Philips, Lloyd Philips, David Joseph and Ken Joseph. In 1975, Phil Fearon (later a member of the bands Galaxy and Kandidate) joined as a member of the group but had later left by 1977. After this, David Joseph recruited other members that lived in the area to join the group.

In 1978 they released their first single aptly named "Hi Tension" that peaked to No. 13 in the UK Singles Chart in May 1978. They then released a second single titled "British Hustle" which eclipsed their first single and peaked to No. 8 in late 1978. In the same year a short film was subsequently made about British soul music called British Hustle.

By 1981, David Reid, Patrick McLean and Paul McLean left the band. The remaining members of Hi Tension continued and secured another recording contract with EMI records. Whilst touring they recruited Courtney Pine as a session player, playing saxophone during their tour. Subsequently, Paul Philips left the band. From 1983 to 1987 David Joseph secured a solo career and accomplished two hit songs: "You Can't Hide (Your Love from Me)" and "Let's Live It Up (Nite People)". 

In 1984, Ken Joseph, Leroy Williams and Jeffrey Guishard remained resilient and secured a further recording contract with Streetwave Records and released the singles "Rat Race" and "You Make Me Happy" in 1984. The latter single was written, produced and arranged by David Pic Conley of the band Surface whom later released a cover version of the song under the title "Happy" for their debut album in 1986.

In 2014, Paul McLean reformed Hi Tension with four original members, Paul Philips, Jeffrey Guishard, Paapa Mensah and his brother Patrick McLean to headline and perform at the Summer Soulstice Festival in Barnet, London.

Discography

Studio albums

Compilation albums
 The Best of David Joseph & Hi-Tension (1993)

Singles

David Joseph solo singles

References

External links
Official website at the Wayback Machine
Hi-Tension Facebook page
Hi-Tension Twitter account

English funk musical groups
English pop music groups